Meckenbeuren is a municipality in the Bodensee district, in Baden-Württemberg, Southern Germany.

Geography

Location

Meckenbeuren is located about eight kilometres north of Friedrichshafen and ten kilometres south of Ravensburg in the lower Schussental valley near Lake Constance.

Districts 
 
The municipality of Meckenbeuren includes, in addition to the core town of Obermeckenbeuren (since 1810), the former municipalities incorporated in 1937 and today's districts of Brochenzell and Liebenau (with the hamlets of Brugg, Hegenberg, Hirschach, Knellesberg, Langentrog, Schwarzenbach, Senglingen and Weiler, the farms of Berg, Buch, Furt, Hasenwinkel, Hohenreute, Holzbauer, Hungersberg, Kratzerach, Laufenen, Lohner, Madenreute, Mühlebach, Ottmarsreute, Rebholz, Regulator, Reuter, Sandgrub, Stengele, Straß, Untertennennenmoos and the houses Habacht) as well as the village of Kehlen, which was incorporated in 1972 (with the villages Kehlen and Reute, the hamlets of Buch, Gerbertshaus, Gunzenhaus, Holzreute, Lochbrücke, Sammletshofen, Sassen, Schürten, Schuppenwies, Sibratshaus and Siglishofen, the courtyards Großbuch, Hechelfurt and Schindelhof as well as the houses Schübelbeer).

Main sights 
 Ravensburger Spieleland: a 25 hectare amusement park in the Liebenau district
 Humpismuseum (Humpis Museum) in the Humpisschloss (Humpis Castle) in the Brochenzell district

Gallery

Twin cities
  Hohwald, Germany, since 1991 
 Kehlen, Luxembourg, since 1993

References 

Bodenseekreis